Taranaki-King Country is a New Zealand parliamentary electorate, returning one Member of Parliament to the New Zealand House of Representatives. The current MP for Taranaki-King Country is Barbara Kuriger of the National Party. She has held this position since the 2014 general election.

Population centres
Taranaki-King Country stretches down the western coast of the North Island, starting at the outskirts of Hamilton, through to the King Country towns of Te Awamutu, Ōtorohanga and Te Kuiti, and ending in the northern Taranaki region, to take in the northern section of the New Plymouth urban area and all of Stratford District. From , it has included the town of Raglan.

The boundaries have gradually been expanded as the population has fallen, relative to the overall population of the country. At the 2013 revision the proposed boundaries received the third highest number (25) of objections in the country. After the 2013 revision the constituency covered parts of 3 regional councils and 7 district councils (Waikato District, Waipa District, Ōtorohanga District, Waitomo District, New Plymouth District, Stratford District, Ruapehu District), including Hamilton Airport.

History
The first MP for Taranaki-King Country was the then Prime Minister of New Zealand, Jim Bolger.

Despite a large swing to ACT Party candidate Owen Jennings, Bolger's chosen successor Shane Ardern won a narrow victory on a heavily reduced turnout.

Members of Parliament

Unless otherwise stated, all MPs terms began and ended at general elections.

Key

List MPs

Members of Parliament elected from party lists in elections where that person also unsuccessfully contested the Taranaki-King Country electorate. Unless otherwise stated, all MPs terms began and ended at general elections.

Election results

2020 election

2017 election

2014 election

2011 election

Electorate (as at 11 November 2011): 41,152

2008 election

2005 election

1999 election
Refer to Candidates in the New Zealand general election 1999 by electorate#Taranaki-King Country for a list of candidates.

1998 by-election

Notes

References

External links
Electorate Profile  Parliamentary Library

New Zealand electorates
1996 establishments in New Zealand
Politics of Taranaki
Politics of Waikato